Each winner of the 1964 Governor General's Awards for Literary Merit was selected by a panel of judges administered by the Canada Council for the Arts.

Winners

English Language
Fiction: Douglas LePan, The Deserter.
Poetry or Drama: Raymond Souster, The Colour of the Times.
Non-Fiction: Phyllis Grosskurth, John Addington Symonds.

French Language
Fiction: Jean-Paul Pinsonneault, Les terres sèches.
Poetry or Drama: Pierre Perrault, Au coeur de la rose.
Non-Fiction: Réjean Robidoux, Roger Martin du Gard et la religion.

Governor General's Awards
Governor General's Awards
Governor General's Awards